Vincent Jen Chin (May 18, 1955 – June 23, 1982) was an American draftsman of Chinese descent who was killed in a racially motivated assault by two white men, Chrysler plant supervisor Ronald Ebens and his stepson, laid-off autoworker Michael Nitz. Ebens and Nitz assailed Chin following a brawl that took place at a strip club in Highland Park, Michigan, where Chin had been celebrating his bachelor party with friends in advance of his upcoming wedding. Against the backdrop of high anti-Japanese sentiment in the United States at the time – known as "Japan bashing" – they had assumed that Chin was Japanese and witnesses described them using anti-Asian racial slurs as they attacked him, ultimately beating him to death. Ebens and Nitz blamed Chin for the success of Japan's automotive industry in the country.

Although accounts vary, the men got into a physical altercation and were removed from the club as a result. Ebens and Nitz eventually found Chin in front of a Highland Park McDonald’s. There, Nitz held Chin down while Ebens repeatedly bashed him in the head with a baseball bat. Chin was taken to Henry Ford Hospital in Detroit, where he died of his injuries four days later. At the time, Metro Detroit was a powder keg of racial animosity toward Asian Americans, specifically as the penetration of Japanese automotive imports in the U.S. domestic market that hastened the decline of Detroit's "Big Three". Resentful workers laid the blame for recent layoffs on Japanese competition.

Ebens and Nitz pleaded guilty to manslaughter in 1983, in a plea bargain from an initial charge of second-degree murder. While Ebens and Nitz never denied the brawl, they claimed the fight was not racially motivated and said they did not use racial epithets. Wayne County Circuit Court Judge Charles Kaufman sentenced Ebens and Nitz to only three years' probation and a $3,000 fine plus costs but with no jail time. Judge Kaufman's rationale for his leniency was that it was Chin who initiated the physical altercation, Ebens and Nitz had no prior convictions, Chin survived for four days on life support, and the prosecutor failed to argue for a more severe sentence. Judge Kaufman further states that Ebens and Nitz "weren't the kind of men you send to jail [...] You don't make the punishment fit the crime; you make the punishment fit the criminal."

The lenient sentence led to an uproar from Asian Americans. The president of the Detroit Chinese Welfare Council said it amounted to a "$3,000 license to kill" Chinese Americans. As a result, the case has since been viewed as a critical turning point for Asian American civil rights engagement and a rallying cry for stronger federal hate crime legislation.

Early life
Chin was born on May 18, 1955, in Guangdong province, Mainland China. He was the only child of Bing Hing "David" Chin (a.k.a. C.W. Hing) and Lily Chin (née Yee). His father earned the right to bring a Chinese bride into the United States through his service in World War II. After Lily suffered a miscarriage in 1949 and was unable to have children, the couple adopted Vincent from a Chinese orphanage in 1961.

Throughout most of the 1960s, Chin grew up in Highland Park. In 1971, after the elderly Hing was mugged, the family moved to Oak Park, Michigan. Vincent Chin graduated from Oak Park High School in 1973, going on to study at Control Data Institute, and Lawrence Tech. At the time of his death, he was employed as an industrial draftsman at Efficient Engineering, an automotive supplier, and working weekends as a waiter at the former Golden Star restaurant in Ferndale, Michigan. He was engaged, and the wedding date set for June 28, 1982.

Homicide
The fight that would lead to the killing of Vincent Chin started at The Fancy Pants Club on June 19, 1982, when Chin took umbrage at a remark that Ebens made to a stripper who had just finished dancing at Chin's table (Chin was having a bachelor party, as he was to be married eight days later). According to an interview by American documentary filmmaker Michael Moore for the Detroit Free Press, after Chin gave the dancer a generous gratuity, Ebens shouted, "Hey, you little motherfuckers!" and told the stripper, "Don't pay any attention to those little fuckers, they wouldn't know a good dancer if they'd seen one."

Ebens claimed that Chin walked over to Ebens and Michael Nitz and threw a punch at Ebens' jaw without provocation, although witnesses at the ensuing trial testified that Ebens also got up and said, "It's because of you little motherfuckers that we're out of work," referring to the Japanese auto industry, particularly Chrysler's increased sales of captively-imported Mitsubishi models rebadged and sold under the Dodge and now-defunct Plymouth brands, and Nitz's layoff from Chrysler in 1979, despite the fact that Chin was of Chinese descent, not Japanese.

The fight escalated as Nitz shoved Chin in defense of his stepfather, and Chin countered. Nitz suffered a cut on his head from a chair that Ebens had intended to use to strike Chin. Chin and his friends left the room, while a bouncer led Ebens and Nitz to the restroom to clean up the wound.
While they were there, Robert Siroskey, one of Chin's friends, came back inside to use the restroom. He apologized to the group, stating that Chin had a few drinks because of his bachelor's party. Ebens and Nitz had also been drinking that night, although not at the club, which did not serve alcohol. Jimmy Choi also reentered the club to look for Siroskey.

When Ebens and Nitz left the club, they encountered Chin and his friends who were waiting outside for Siroskey. Chin called Ebens a "chicken shit", at which point Nitz retrieved a baseball bat from his car and Chin and his friends ran down the street.

Ebens and Nitz searched the neighborhood for 20 to 30 minutes and even paid another man 20 dollars to help look for Chin, before finding him at a McDonald's restaurant. Chin tried to escape but was held by Nitz while Ebens repeatedly bludgeoned Chin with a baseball bat until Chin's head cracked open. A policeman who witnessed the beating said that Ebens was swinging the bat like he was swinging “for a home run.” He was immediately rushed to Henry Ford Hospital. Chin was unconscious when he arrived; he never regained consciousness and died on June 23, 1982, after being in a coma for four days. Ebens was arrested for the initial assault. After Chin's death, Ebens and Nitz were charged with second-degree murder.

Legal history

Inaction by the government and advocacy groups
At the time, government officials, politicians, and several prominent legal organizations generally dismissed the theory that civil rights laws should be applied to the beating of Vincent Chin. The Detroit chapters of the American Civil Liberties Union and the National Lawyers Guild did not consider Chin's killing a violation of his civil rights.

At first, a new group named itself American Citizens for Justice (ACJ) was the only group that lent its support to the theory that existing civil rights laws should be applied to Asian Americans. Eventually, the national body of the National Lawyers Guild endorsed its efforts.

State criminal charges
Ebens was arrested and taken into custody at the scene of the crime by two off-duty police officers who had witnessed the beating. Ebens and Nitz were convicted in a county court by Wayne County Circuit Judge Charles Kaufman of manslaughter, after a plea bargain brought the charges down from second-degree murder. They served no jail time and were given three years' probation, fined $3,000, and ordered to pay $780 in court costs. In a response letter to protests from American Citizens for Justice, Kaufman said, "These weren't the kind of men you send to jail... You don't make the punishment fit the crime; you make the punishment fit the criminal."

Federal civil rights charges
The verdict angered the Asian American communities in the Detroit area and around the country. Journalist Helen Zia and lawyer Liza Chan led the fight for federal charges, which resulted in the two killers being accused of two counts of violating Chin's civil rights, under section 245 of title 18 of the United States Code.

The 1984 federal civil rights case against the men found Ebens guilty of the second count and sentenced him to 25 years in prison; Nitz was acquitted of both counts. After an appeal, Ebens' conviction was overturned in 1986—a federal appeals court found that an attorney had improperly coached prosecution witnesses.

After a retrial that was moved to Cincinnati, Ohio, due to the publicity the case had received in Detroit, a jury cleared Ebens of all charges in 1987.

Civil suits
A civil suit for the unlawful death of Vincent Chin was settled out of court on March 23, 1987. Michael Nitz was ordered to pay $50,000. Ronald Ebens was ordered to pay $1.5 million, at $200/month for the first two years and 25% of his income or $200/month thereafter, whichever was greater. This represented the projected loss of income from Vincent Chin's engineering position, as well as Lily Chin's loss of Vincent's services as a laborer and driver. However, Chin's estate would not be allowed to garnish social security, disability, or Ebens' pension from Chrysler, nor could the estate place a lien on Ebens' house.

In November 1989, Ebens reappeared in court for a creditor's hearing, where he detailed his finances and reportedly pledged to make good on his debt to the Chin estate. However, in 1997, the Chin estate was forced to renew the civil suit, as it was allowed to do every ten years. With accrued interest and other charges, the adjusted total became $4,683,653.89. Ebens sought in 2015 to have the resulting lien against his house vacated.

Aftermath

Chin was interred in Detroit's Forest Lawn Cemetery.

In September 1987, Chin's mother, Lily, moved from Oak Park back to her hometown of Guangzhou, China, reportedly to avoid being reminded of her son's death. She returned to the United States for medical treatment in late 2001 and died on June 9, 2002. Prior to her death, Lily Chin established a scholarship in Vincent's memory, to be administered by American Citizens for Justice.

Legacy
The attack was considered a hate crime by many, but it predated the passage of hate crime laws in the United States. The ACJ quickly gained the support of diverse ethnic and religious groups, advocacy organizations, and politicians like the Detroit City Council president and Congressman John Conyers.

After Chin's murder was raised during a 1998 House of Representatives hearing on the Hate Crimes Prevention Act of 1997, Conyers mistook Chin to be Japanese-American and argued that Chin's case was not of racial injustice but rather political, about the automobile industry. Conyers later introduced multiple hate crimes bills from 1999 to 2009.

Chin's case has been cited by some Asian Americans in support of the idea that they are considered "perpetual foreigners" in contrast to "real" Americans who are considered full citizens. Lily Chin stated: "What kind of law is this? What kind of justice? This happened because my son is Chinese. If two Chinese killed a white person, they must go to jail, maybe for their whole lives... Something is wrong with this country."

In 2010, the city of Ferndale, Michigan, erected a legal milestone marker at the intersection of Woodward Avenue and 9 Mile Road in memorial of the killing of Chin.

In the media

Documentaries
Who Killed Vincent Chin? (1988), documentary by Renee Tajima and Christine Choy. Nominated for a 1989 Academy Award for Best Documentary.
Vincent Who? (2009), documentary written and produced by Curtis Chin and directed by Tony Lam.
"Killer Swing", Fatal Encounters. Investigation Discovery. July 23, 2013.
Who Killed Vincent Chin?' Revisited, Making Michigan More Competitive. One Detroit. June 9, 2022.

In popular culture
Because They Thought He Was... is a sculpture by Consuelo Echeverria. It is a life-size depiction of the incident made from forged steel auto parts.
In 1998, a play based on the case, Cherylene Lee's Carry the Tiger to the Mountain, was performed at the Contemporary American Theater Festival in Shepherdstown, West Virginia. The West End Theatre in Manhattan performed the play in June 2007 as part of the first National Asian American Theater Festival.
Chin is referenced in the Blue Scholars' song "Morning of America".
Chin is referenced in The Dead Milkmen song "Anthropology Days".
On January 30, 2013, Judge Denny Chin along with faculty and professors from the University of California, Hastings College of the Law performed a re-enactment of the Vincent Chin trial.
Referenced in The Twilight Zone, season 1, episode 21, titled "Wong's Lost and Found Emporium" (aired November 22, 1985), as a central reason for the protagonist to have lost his compassion.
The story of Vincent Chin's killing as told by his childhood friend, is the main subject of the 3rd section, titled Jade, of Peter Ho Davies' 2016 book The Fortunes.
Chin is referenced in the June 7, 2021, episode of Last Week Tonight with John Oliver about Asian Americans.
Chin is referenced in the poem "Oriental Rat Flea" by Bryan Thao Worra.
May 19, 2022, a Grey's Anatomy episode listed Chin's name during a discussion surrounding hate crimes committed against Asian Americans.

Other
In 1983, Lily Chin appeared on The Phil Donahue Show in order to bring public attention to the case.
The 2001 book A Day for Vincent Chin and Me by Jacqueline Turner Banks is about a Japanese-American child's efforts to slow down the traffic on a residential street in Kentucky, while his parents mount a local protest in support of the Chin case.
In 2018, Annie Tan, Chin's first cousin once removed, told the story of her discovery of her connection with Chin as played as a part of The Moth Radio Hour.

See also
Anti-Chinese sentiment in the United States
Anti-Japanese sentiment in the United States
Hate crime laws in the United States
Racism in the United States
Stop Asian Hate
 List of homicides in Michigan

References

Further reading

External links
 American Citizens for Justice
 
 Opening lecture at the 5th Annual Conference in Citizenship Studies: Boundaries, March 27–29, 2008, by Frank H. Wu, Wayne State University
 US v. Ebens appellate ruling
 
 Vincent Chin page at McMurder.com
 Vincent Who? (2009) – Official Movie Site

Anti-Chinese violence in the United States
Anti-Japanese sentiment in the United States
Asian-American issues
Asian-American-related controversies
Cold War history of the United States
Deaths by beating in the United States
Deaths by person in Michigan
Highland Park, Michigan
Racially motivated violence against Asian-Americans
1982 in Detroit
1982 in Michigan
June 1982 crimes
June 1982 events in the United States